Michael Kyrios (born 30 December 1958) is an Australian clinical psychologist. He is an emeritus professor at Flinders University, after serving as Vice-President and Executive Dean at the university's College of Education, Psychology and Social Work.

He was previously a professor at the Australian National University and the director of its Research School of Psychology, and president of the Australian Psychological Society from 2014 to 2016. His other previous appointments include Swinburne University of Technology and the University of Melbourne. His research focuses on areas such as obsessive–compulsive disorder (OCD), addiction, anxiety, and depression. More recently, he has developed approaches to coping mentally and facilitating wellbeing during the coronavirus pandemic [[see Órama Institute at Flinders University ]].

He has also developed online treatments for OCD and hoarding.

References

External links
 from the Flinders University

1958 births
Academic staff of the Australian National University
Australian people of Greek descent
Australian psychologists
Clinical psychologists
Academic staff of Flinders University
Living people
Place of birth missing (living people)
Academic staff of Swinburne University of Technology
Academic staff of the University of Melbourne